Scheiner is a German surname. Notable people with the surname include:

Artuš Scheiner (1863–1938), Czech painter and illustrator
Christoph Scheiner (1573/75–1650), Jesuit priest, physicist and astronomer (born c. 1573)
David Scheiner (born 1938), American physician and activist
Elliot Scheiner (born 1947), American record producer and record engineer
Julius Scheiner (1858–1913), German astronomer, astrophysicist and Jesuit
Mordechai Scheiner, Israeli Orthodox rabbi
Rebecca Scheiner, German stage director
Yitzchok Scheiner (1922–2021), Israeli-American rabbi

See also 
Scheiner (crater), lunar impact crater that lies to the west of the enormous walled plain Clavius, named after Christoph Scheiner
Shiner (surname) 
Schein

German-language surnames
Jewish surnames